Anatololacerta is a genus of lizards of the family Lacertidae.

Species
 Anatololacerta anatolica (Werner, 1900) - Anatolian rock lizard
 Anatololacerta danfordi (Günther, 1876) - Danford's lizard
 Anatololacerta finikensis (Eiselt & Schmidtler, 1987)
 Anatololacerta ibrahimi (Eiselt & Schmidtler, 1986)
 Anatololacerta pelasgiana (Mertens, 1959)

References

 
Lizard genera
Taxa named by Edwin Nicholas Arnold
Taxa named by Oscar J. Arribas
Taxa named by Salvador Carranza